Emily Donahoe is an American actress, writer and producer.

Education 
Donahoe earned a Bachelor of Arts degree from Vassar College and a Master of Fine Arts from the  University of California, San Diego

Career 
She won a Helen Hayes Award in 2004 in the category Outstanding Supporting Actress, Resident Play,
for her performance in Shakespeare in Hollywood at the Arena Stage. 

In 2016 she won an Obie Award for her performance in The Christians by Lucas Hnath. She appeared in The Christians as Jenny at the Off-Broadway Playwrights Horizons from August 28, 2015 to October 25, 2015. 

Donahue appeared in the Amy Herzog play Mary Jane at the Yale Repertory Theatre in New Haven, Connecticut, April 28, 2017 to May 20, 2017. She received a Connecticut Critics Circle Award nomination for her performance as the title character.

She was a 2017 Beinecke Fellow at the Yale School of Drama.

She is the founder and principal of "WOMENSPEAK Training", a consultancy that specializes in training female speakers and in providing organizations and diversity partners with tools for "building female voice and visibility in the public arena" and "amplifying women's voices in order to drive both personal and organizational performance." She has been a featured speaker for the Women's Campaign School at Yale University.

Filmography

Film

Television

Personal life 
She married Michael O'Keefe in 2011 and they have one child.

References

External links 
 
 
 

American stage actresses
Living people
Year of birth missing (living people)
21st-century American actresses
Place of birth missing (living people)
University of California, San Diego alumni
Obie Award recipients